Righteousness And Humidity is a 2003 album recorded by the English guitarist Martin Simpson and released on the Topic Records label.

Track listing
 "John Hardy" (Trad.) 3:43
 "Horn Island" (Martin Simpson) 3:38
 "I Can't Keep Myself From Crying Sometime" (Trad.) 5:47
 "Easy Money" (Martin Simpson) 2:45
 "Payday" (Trad.) 3:15
 "This World Is A Trouble And A Trial" (Trad.) 2:06
 "Ghosts In The Pines" (Martin Simpson) 1:31
 "The Coo Coo Bird" (Trad.) 4:04
 "Love Never Dies" (Martin Simpson) 4:24
 "Some Dark Holler" (Trad.) 2:29
 "Rico" (Martin Simpson) 4:19
 "Georgie" (Trad.) 6:23
 "Wild Bill Jones" (Trad.) 5:02
 "The Devil's Partiality" (Gallivan Burwell) 3:52
 "Rollin' And Tumblin'" (Trad.) 3:58
 "The Last Shot Got Him" (Trad.) 2:03

Martin Simpson albums
2007 albums